Memphis, described by Jacob Hübner in 1819, is a Neotropical nymphalid butterfly genus in the subfamily Charaxinae.

There are 61 species in the genus. All are Neotropical and the undersides of the wings closely resemble dead leaves. In the past Memphis was considered a subgenus of Anaea.

Species
Listed alphabetically within groups:

Species group pasibula:
Memphis pasibula (Doubleday, [1849])
Memphis falcata (Hopffer, 1874)

Species group aureola:
Memphis anna (Staudinger, 1897)
Memphis aureola (Bates, 1866)
Memphis dia (Godman & Salvin, [1884])
Memphis polyxo (H. Druce, 1874)

Species group verticordia:
Memphis artacaena (Hewitson, 1869) – white-patched leafwing
Memphis perenna (Godman & Salvin, [1884]) – big-spotted leafwing
?Memphis pleione (Godart, 1819)
Memphis verticordia (Hübner, 1824)

Species group arginussa:
Memphis arginussa (Geyer, 1832) – mottled leafwing
Memphis herbacea (Butler & H. Druce, 1872) – scarce leafwing
Memphis lemnos (H. Druce, 1877)
Memphis pithyusa (R. Felder, 1869) – blue leafwing, pale-spotted leafwing

Species group hedemanni:
Memphis acaudata (Röber, 1916)
Memphis hedemanni (R. Felder, 1869) – double-banded leafwing
Memphis praxias (Hopffer, 1874)

Species group glauce:
Memphis glauce (C. Felder & R. Felder, 1862)

Species group appias:
Memphis appias (Hübner, [1825])
Memphis xenippa (Hall, 1935)
Memphis xenocles (Westwood, 1850) – corner-spotted leafwing

Species group polycarmes:
Memphis ambrosia (H. Druce, 1874)
Memphis anassa (C. Felder & R. Felder, 1862)
Memphis aulica (Röber, 1916)
Memphis basilia (Stoll, [1780])
Memphis cleomestra (Hewitson, 1869)
Memphis forreri (Godman & Salvin, [1884]) – Guatemalan leafwing
Memphis grandis (H. Druce, 1877)
Memphis laura (H. Druce, 1877)
Memphis lineata (Salvin, 1869)
Memphis lyceus (H. Druce, 1877)
Memphis mora (H. Druce, 1874)
Memphis nenia (H. Druce, 1877)
Memphis offa (H. Druce, 1877)
Memphis phantes (Hopffer, 1874)
Memphis polycarmes (Fabricius, 1775)
Memphis proserpina (Salvin, 1869) – great leafwing

Species group moruus:
Memphis moruus (Fabricius, 1775) – laurel leafwing
Memphis oenomais (Boisduval, 1870) – Boisduval's leafwing
Memphis philumena (Doubleday, [1849]) – orange-striped leafwing

Species group eribotes:
Memphis acidalia (Hübner, [1819])
Memphis beatrix (H. Druce, 1874)
Memphis catinka (H. Druce, 1877)
Memphis hirta (Weymer, 1907)
Memphis laertes (Cramer, [1775])
Memphis leonida (Stoll, [1782])
Memphis otrere (Hübner, 1825)
Memphis pseudiphis (Staudinger, 1887)

Species group iphis:
Memphis alberta (H. Druce, 1876)
Memphis boliviana (H. Druce, 1877)
Memphis cerealia (H. Druce, 1877)
Memphis cluvia (Hopffer, 1874)
Memphis iphis (Latreille, [1813])
Memphis lorna (H. Druce, 1877)
Memphis moeris (C. Felder & R. Felder, [1867])

Ungrouped:
Memphis eurypyle C. Felder & R. Felder, 1862 – pointed leafwing
Memphis juliani Constantino, 1999
Memphis maria Pyrcz & Neild, 1996
Memphis montesino Pyrcz, 1995
Memphis neidhoeferi (Rotger, Escalante, & Coronado, 1965) – wavy-edged leafwing
Memphis salinasi Pyrcz, 1993
Memphis viloriae Pyrcz & Neild, 1996
Memphis wellingi (Miller & Miller, 1976)

Gallery

References

External links

TOL
images representing Memphis, at EoL
BOA Photographs of type specimens.
Pteron Images. In Japanese but binomial names. Two pages.
 Includes images.

Anaeini
Nymphalidae of South America
Taxa named by Jacob Hübner
Butterfly genera